Anania murcialis is a species of moth in the family Crambidae. It is found in Spain and Morocco.

The length of the forewings is 9–10 mm. The forewings have pale brown pattern elements conspicuously suffused by black scales. The hindwing subterminal area has large white, black-filled ellipses between the veins.

References

Moths described in 1895
Pyraustinae
Moths of Europe
Moths of Africa